Blood and Hope is an original novella written by Iain McLaughlin and based on the long-running British science fiction television series Doctor Who.  It features the Fifth Doctor, Peri and Erimem. It was released both as a standard edition hardback and a deluxe edition featuring a frontispiece by Walter Howarth. Both editions have a foreword by John Ostrander.

2004 British novels
2004 science fiction novels
Doctor Who novellas
British science fiction novels
British novellas
Telos Publishing books